Cloutierville is an unincorporated community in Natchitoches Parish, Louisiana, United States. The community is part of the Natchitoches Micropolitan Statistical Area, off exit 119 of Interstate 49.

This is a homeland of many multiracial Louisiana Creole people. It is in the NPS Cane River National Heritage Area.

History
The town was built on the plantation of Alexis Cloutier and incorporated in 1822.

The plantation house was later owned by Kate Chopin. Chopin's former home was open to the public as the Bayou Folk Museum, before its destruction by fire in 2008.

The historic wooden St. John the Baptist Catholic Church and its cemetery are located in Cloutierville.

Education 

The community is served by Natchitoches Parish School Board.

See also
Cane River National Heritage Area topics
National Register of Historic Places listings in Natchitoches Parish, Louisiana

References

Unincorporated communities in Natchitoches Parish, Louisiana
Cane River National Heritage Area
Populated places in Ark-La-Tex
Unincorporated communities in Louisiana